The Hangbu is a river of Feixi County, Anhui province, China. It originates on the north slope of the Dabie Mountains and is the largest of 33 tributaries of Lake Chaohu. The river flows into its western bank in a northeasterly direction and flows through the township of Sanhe. Longhekou Reservoir was built on the river in 1958.

References

Rivers of Anhui